The Grand Canyon Supergroup is a Mesoproterozoic to a Neoproterozoic sequence of sedimentary strata, partially exposed in the eastern Grand Canyon of Arizona. This group comprises the Unkar Group, Nankoweap Formation, Chuar Group and the Sixtymile Formation, which overlie Vishnu Basement Rocks. Several notable landmarks of the Grand Canyon, such as the Isis Temple and Cheops Pyramid, and the Apollo Temple, are surface manifestations of the Grand Canyon Supergroup.

Geology
The Grand Canyon Supergroup  overlies the Vishnu Basement Rocks but was never subjected to metamorphism. The units of the Supergroup were faulted and then tilted from 10 to 15 degrees.

A section of the Unkar Group members is visible north of Grand Canyon Village, on the South Rim; specifically at the intersection of the Bright Angel Fault and the Grandview–Phantom Fault (which cuts through Phantom Creek), on the North Rim (at the north side of Granite Gorge).

The majority of the Grand Canyon Supergroup geologic members are found in the south and southwest stretch of the Colorado River starting from Marble Canyon, traverses the southeast perimeter of the Kaibab Plateau, and flows northeasterly entering Granite Gorge and regions of the Vishnu Basement Rocks. Here, the river leaves the last of the Unkar Group's lower-unit members behind. Other sections of the Unkar Group reappear downstream due to the general faulting of the Grand Canyon.

The units of the Grand Canyon Supergroup (1250 Ma to 700 Ma):
 4 – Sixtymile Formation (ends at ~700 Ma)
 3 – Chuar Group
 [b] – Kwagunt Formation
 [a] – Galeros Formation
 2 – Nankoweap Formation
 1 – Unkar Group
 (5) – Cardenas Basalt, youngest, Meso-Proterozoic 1070 ± 70 million years
 (4) – Dox Formation
 (3) – Shinumo Quartzite
 (2B) – Diabase dikes and sills–(dikes and 4 sills, lateral  thickness max; associated with Cardenas Basalt)
 (2) – Hakatai Shale
 (1) – Bass Formation, (begins at ~1250 Ma)

Fossils
Stromatolites are found in the Supergroup.

Specific locales
Various creeks, canyons, or landforms give clues to unit locales of the Grand Canyon Supergroup members.

Isis Temple and "Cheops Pyramid"

The Isis Temple and Cheops Pyramid formation is a part of the Shinumo Quartzite 'island' and made up of the bottom three Unkar Group members (containing Unkar units 1–3, see above). They were overlain at the Great Unconformity, onto Tapeats Sandstone (named for the bottom unit of the marine transgression series consisting of sandstone–(conglomerates)–shale–limestone laid down by the Tapeats Sea), and are evident along the Colorado River on the Tonto Platform. The three units of the Tonto Group are 3 – Muav Limestone, upon 2 – Bright Angle Shale, upon 1 – Tapeats Sandstone. The Tapeats is a thin cliff-former unit found along Granite Gorge and its side canyons forming a flat surface in locales not dramatically affected by faulting, up-warping (domes), or down-warping.

The Isis Temple with Cheops Pyramid formation contains the bottom three members, a virtual quartzite 'mountain island' in the Tapeats Sea. (Tapeats Sandstone was deposited only around Shinumo Quartzite monadnocks.) The formation is a fault-block section located north of Granite Gorge and the intersection of Phantom Creek with the Bright Angel Canyon (which is also the intersection of the Bright Angel and Grandview–Phantom faults). The dimensions of this block are approximately 3.5 mi by 2.0 mi, with slopes of multi-colored Hakatai Shale and Bass Formation (shown as reddish, yellowish, and lavender).

Apollo Temple
The Apollo Temple formation occurs at the southeast of the Kaibab Plateau (Walhalla Plateau). The base of the largely flat-topped Redwall Limestone monolith sits upon cliffs of Muav Limestone, then Bright Angel Shale, and Tapeats Sandstone. The Nankoweap Formation is near the monolith's center of the base. The northeast side of the base merges into the overlying unit above the Nankoweap, the Chuar Group slopes.

Northeast Grand Canyon
In the northeast Grand Canyon, the Tapeats is still the defining cliff unit at the Great Unconformity between the paleozoic Tapeats Sandstone and the basement geology below. However, the entire east of the Kaibab Plateau is an uplifted side of the East Kaibab Monocline. The down-dropped east side of the Kaibab Plateau is defined by the south-flowing Colorado River.

Colorado sits below the East Rim, where the Little Colorado River enters from the east-southeast. Other sub-faults intersect it north and south of Little Colorado. Even further to the extreme northeast, at the Marble Canyon (Marble Platform), four parallel faults (2 sets of 2 – including the Eminence Fault), run parallel to the side of the Paria Plateau, striking northeasterly, resulting in the Colorado River's sharp turn to the southwest. The river then turns due-south – running down the East Kaibab Monocline.

References

Further reading
 Arizona DeLorme Atlas & Gazetteer, 5th Edition, c. 2002, 76 pages, pp. 24, 32.
 Arizona Road & Recreation Atlas, Benchmark Maps, 2nd Edition, c. 1998, 112 pages, pp. 28–29, 62–63.
 Keller, B.; 2012; Overview of the Grand Canyon Supergroup; Grand Hikes; accessed.
 Mathis, A., and C. Bowman; 2007; The Grand Age of Rocks: The Numeric Ages for Rocks Exposed within Grand Canyon, Grand Canyon National Park; Arizona; National Park Service, Grand Canyon National Park.

External links 

 Grand Canyon Supergroup , "Stratigraphy of the Parks of the Colorado Plateau;" 3-D Parks; USGS; USGS.gov website; accessed November 2013.
 Brandriss, M. (2004) Angular unconformity between Proterozoic and Cambrian rocks, Grand Canyon, Arizona.  GeoDIL, A Geoscience Digital Image Library, University of North Dakota, Grand Forks, North Dakota.

Grand Canyon
Geologic groups of Arizona
Geologic supergroups of the United States
Natural history of the Grand Canyon
Stratigraphy of Arizona
Precambrian United States